Perlucidus is a cloud variety that generally appears in only two cloud types, with those cloud types being altocumulus and stratocumulus, this cloud variety is easily recognizable, with its appearance being small gaps showing up in one of the cloud types that it shows up in, which let higher clouds be seen This cloud variety forms when shallow convection starts in a cloud layer that did not previously have perlucidus variety characteristics, the gaps that make the sky visible in these clouds indicate regions where air is sinking, this cloud variety may appear either as a translucent cloud or an opaque cloud

See also 
Opacus (cloud variety)

Translucidus (cloud variety)

References

Cloud types